The Honorable James Browne (1736/8 – 22 October 1790) was an Irish Member of Parliament and Law Officer. He sat in the House of Commons of Ireland from 1768 to 1790.

He was born in County Mayo, fourth son of John Browne, 1st Earl of Altamont and Anne Gore, daughter of Sir Arthur Gore, 2nd Baronet and Elizabeth Annesley.

He entered  Middle Temple in 1755 and was called to the Bar in 1760. He was advanced to the rank of Prime Serjeant-at-law (Ireland) in 1780. He was dismissed following the change of Government in 1782, but was reappointed in 1784 when a promotion to the Bench left the office open. He was dismissed a second time in 1787.He died unmarried in 1790.

Hart suggests that he was a failure as Prime Serjeant, but adds that the office itself was by the 1780s an anachronism. Although in theory, the Prime Serjeant was still the Government's most senior legal advisor, in practice the Attorney General of Ireland had for over a century had precedence over the Serjeants. The office of Prime Serjeant was abolished in 1805 following the death of Arthur Browne.

He was an MP for Jamestown from 1768 to 1776, for Tuam from 1776 to 1783, and for Castlebar from  1783 to 1790.

References
 

1730s births
Year of birth uncertain
1790 deaths
Irish MPs 1761–1768
Irish MPs 1769–1776
Irish MPs 1776–1783
Irish MPs 1783–1790
Members of the Parliament of Ireland (pre-1801) for County Leitrim constituencies
Members of the Parliament of Ireland (pre-1801) for County Galway constituencies
Members of the Parliament of Ireland (pre-1801) for County Mayo constituencies
Younger sons of earls
Serjeants-at-law (Ireland)